Saint Rose may refer to:

People  
Saint Rose of Rozoy (1050?-1130)
Saint Rose of Viterbo (1235–1252)
Saint Rose of Lima (1586–1617)
Saint Rose Philippine Duchesne (1759–1862)
Saint Rose Kim (1784–1839)  
Saint Rose Fan Hui (1855?-1900) 
Saint Rose Chen Aijie (1878?-1900) 
Saint Rose Zhao (1878?-1900)

Places

Canada

Manitoba
Sainte Rose du Lac, Manitoba, a small French-speaking town
Ste. Rose du Lac Airport
Ste. Rose (electoral district), a provincial electoral division

Nova Scotia
St. Rose, Nova Scotia

Quebec
Sainte-Rose, Quebec, a former city that is now a district of Laval, Quebec
Sainte-Rose (electoral district), an electoral district within Laval, Quebec
Sainte-Rose-de-Watford, Quebec, a municipality
Sainte-Rose-du-Nord, Quebec, a parish

Guadeloupe
 Sainte-Rose, Guadeloupe, a commune

Réunion
 Sainte-Rose, Réunion, a commune in Réunion

United States
Saint Rose, Illinois, a village
St. Rose, Louisiana, a census-designated place in Saint Charles Parish
St. Rose, Ohio, an unincorporated community 
Saint Rose, Wisconsin, an unincorporated community

Other uses
College of Saint Rose, in Albany, New York, U.S.
Saint Rose Academy, a private elementary school in Birmingham, Alabama
St. Rose Church (disambiguation), various churches
St. Rose Dominican Hospital – Rose de Lima Campus, in Henderson, Nevada, U.S.
St. Rose Hospital, in Hayward, California, U.S.

See also
Santa Rosa (disambiguation)
Santa Rosa Cathedral (disambiguation)